MWB Group Holdings was a British-based property investment and development business. Headquartered in London, it was listed on the London Stock Exchange, before being put into administration in 2012. As of late 2015, together with MWB Management Services, and MWB Serviced Office Holdings, the company was recorded by Companies House as "in liquidation". Also as of late 2015, hospitality business magazine The Caterer listed MWG Group Holdings as "no longer trading".

Operation
The Group's business interests included providing serviced office accommodation at offices in the UK through a 71.5% interest in MWB Business Exchange plc. MWB were also involved in the operation of the Malmaison and Hotel du Vin hotel chains, as well as the Liberty & Co. department store on Regent Street in the West End of London's shopping district. Opened originally in 1874 by Arthur Lasenby Liberty, Liberty & Co. was sold for an undisclosed fee in 2010.

References

External links
 Official Website

Defunct companies based in London
Companies established in 1982
Property companies of the United Kingdom
1982 establishments in England